The 1982 Idaho Vandals football team represented the University of Idaho in the 1982 NCAA Division I-AA football season. The Vandals, led by first-year head coach Dennis Erickson, were members of the Big Sky Conference and played their home games at the Kibbie Dome, an indoor facility on campus in Moscow, Idaho.

Idaho defeated rival Boise State for the first time in  the first of twelve straight over the Broncos. The Vandals also defeated Idaho State, the defending conference and national champions; the consecutive intrastate games were both on 

Idaho rebounded from the previous season, in which they were preseason favorites, but finished  overall and winless in conference play under fourth-year head coach Jerry Davitch. The 1981 team lost their final six games, finishing with a fifth consecutive loss to Boise State.

The Vandals won all six home games in 1982 and finished at  overall. The nine victories were the most in school history, later surpassed only by the 1988 and 1993 teams, both of which won eleven games and reached the

Division I-AA playoffs
After recent Big Sky domination by Boise State, Idaho State, and Nevada, the 1982 season finished with three other teams at the top  Idaho, Montana, and Montana State.  After Idaho finished the regular season with a conference loss at Reno, Montana was declared the conference champion as it defeated the other two. (Montana State was the odd team out, as the Bobcats lost to both Montana and Idaho.) Montana and Idaho were both selected for the first time to participate in the Division I-AA playoffs, newly expanded to twelve teams for the fifth season of I-AA.

Although the Grizzlies (6–5, 5–2) were the conference champions due to their 40–16 win over Idaho in Missoula in mid-October, the Vandals were chosen by the NCAA to host the late November game, primarily due to their indoor  Idaho won the rematch  played before a sparse afternoon crowd in Moscow two days after Thanksgiving, and advanced to the quarterfinals on the road against eventual champion 

EKU was a I-AA finalist the previous three seasons; they won the title in 1979, but lost to Big Sky champions Boise State in 1980 and Idaho State in 1981.  Down by a large margin early, Idaho mounted a comeback and nearly became the third team from the state to defeat EKU in the playoffs in as many years. The Vandals were well into EKU territory with 31 seconds remaining, but came up 8 points short after a

Notable players
Linebacker Sam Merriman from Tucson was selected in the seventh round (177th overall) of the 1983 NFL Draft by the Seattle Seahawks. A four-year starter for the Vandals, he played five seasons with Seattle, primarily on special teams. A serious knee injury in a 1988 preseason game ended his playing career. Junior quarterback Ken Hobart led the Vandals to an 8–3 record as a senior in 1983, then played a season in the USFL with Jacksonville in 1984 and several in the CFL.

Coaches
The 1982 season was the first as a collegiate head coach for Dennis Erickson, age 35, who was previously the offensive coordinator at San Jose State under Jack Elway. He had coached in Moscow in 1974 and 1975, as offensive coordinator under Ed Troxel. Both of Erickson's coordinators for the 1982 Vandals were future head coaches at Idaho and other programs. Keith Gilbertson left after the 1982 season for Los Angeles of the new USFL, returned to Idaho in 1985, and was promoted after the season when Erickson left for Wyoming.

Defensive coordinator John L. Smith followed Erickson to Wyoming in 1986 and Washington State in 1987.  Smith returned to the Vandals in January 1989 to succeed Gilbertson, who had left a month before to coach the offensive line for the Washington Huskies under Don James. Erickson left WSU for Miami in early March. Alumnus Chris Tormey was the Vandals' defensive line coach in 1982 and 1983; he left for Washington, then returned in 1995 as head coach for five seasons.

Schedule

Roster

All-conference
Quarterback Ken Hobart, tight end Kurt Vestman, wide receiver Vic Wallace, and linebacker Sam Merriman were named to the Big Sky all-conference  Hobart was the league's outstanding offensive player (and repeated in 1983). Vandals named to the second team were wide receiver Ron Whittenburg, nose guard Paul Griffin, linebacker John Fortner, and safety Boyce Bailey.

NFL Draft
One Vandal senior was selected in the 1983 NFL Draft, which lasted twelve rounds (335 selections).

List of Idaho Vandals in the NFL Draft

References

External links
 Gem of the Mountains: 1983 University of Idaho yearbook – 1982 football season
 Idaho Argonaut – student newspaper – 1982 editions

Idaho
Idaho Vandals football seasons
Big Sky Conference football champion seasons
Idaho Vandals football